Felix Michel may refer to:

 Felix Michel (born 1984), German canoeist
 Felix Michel Melki (born 1994), Lebanese–Swedish footballer
 Félix-Michel Ngonge (born 1967), Congolese footballer